Night in December (French: Nuit de décembre) is a 1940 drama film directed by Curtis Bernhardt and starring Pierre Blanchar, Renée Saint-Cyr and Gilbert Gil.

The film's art direction was by Henri Ménessier.

Cast
 Pierre Blanchar as Pierre Darmont 
 Renée Saint-Cyr as Anne Morris / Helen Morris  
 Gilbert Gil as Jacques Morel  
 Jean Tissier as Camille  
 Marcel André as James Arthur Morris  
 Eugène Stuber as Le porteur 
 Pearl Argyle as Betty, la jeune ballerine  
 Bernard Blier as Edouard  
 Marcel Delannoy as Le chef d'orchestre en 1919  
 Dora Doll as Une fille de la bande  
 Georges Flateau as Le maître d'hôtel  
 Gustave Gallet as Le médecin au concert de 1939  
 Anthony Gildès as Le concierge du Conservatoire  
 Maurice Jaubert as Le chef d'orchestre en 1939 
 Maurice Nasil as Le représentant 
 Jean Parédès as Un figurant  
 Marcel Pérès as Le chauffeur du prince  
 Serge Reggiani as Un figurant 
 Jacques Simonot as Un copain  
 Monique Thibaut as Une figurante

References

Bibliography 
 Crisp, Colin. French Cinema—A Critical Filmography: Volume 1, 1929–1939. Indiana University Press, 2015.

External links 
 

1940 films
1940 comedy-drama films
French comedy-drama films
1940s French-language films
Films based on works by Bernhard Kellermann
Films directed by Curtis Bernhardt
French black-and-white films
Cine-Allianz films
1940s French films